Dalit Muslim are low caste muslim Untouchables, also called  Dalits, who have converted to Islam.

Background
Aftab Alam, a political scientist, states: "But caste and untouchability is a lived reality for Muslims living in India and South Asia, and untouchability is the community's worst-kept secret."Even though Islam is egalitarian in its social ethics, Indian Muslim society is characterised by caste-like features, consisting of several caste-like groups (jatis, biraderis). Despite the conversion to Islam, the social and economic conditions of the Muslims in each caste hardly changed, and they remained tied down to their traditional occupations.

Reservation
Most of the people claiming Dalit muslim status are already getting reservation as OBC.

See also 
 Pasmanda Muslim Mahaz, the political movement involving Dalit Muslims
 Caste system among South Asian Muslims

References

External links 
 Dalit Muslims of India, Al Jazeera Documentary